The 1878 North Staffordshire by-election was fought on 24 April 1878.  The byelection was fought due to the elevation to the peerage of the incumbent Conservative MP, Charles Adderley.  It was won by the Conservative candidate Robert William Hanbury who was unopposed.

References

1878 in England
1878 elections in the United Kingdom
By-elections to the Parliament of the United Kingdom in Staffordshire constituencies
19th century in Staffordshire
Unopposed by-elections to the Parliament of the United Kingdom in English constituencies